Orange Honey is a 2012 Spanish-Portuguese period drama film directed by Imanol Uribe which stars Iban Garate, Blanca Suárez and Karra Elejalde alongside Eduard Fernández, Carlos Santos, José Manuel Poga, Bárbara Lennie, Ángela Molina and Nora Navas.

Plot 
Set in Andalusia in the 1950s, during the Francoist dictatorship, the plot concerns the switch towards clandestinity of Enrique, a young conscript engaged to Carmen.

Cast

Production 

Orange Honey is a joint Spanish-Portuguese co-production by Alta Producción and Fado Filmes, with participation of TVE. Shooting locations included Jerez and Madrid.

Release 
The film screened at the 15th Málaga Film Festival on 22 April 2012. Distributed by Alta Classics, the film had a wide release in Spanish theatres on 1 June 2012. Likewise, the release in Portuguese theatres was scheduled for 9 October 2014.

Reception 
Javier Ocaña of El País assessed that the writing by Remedios Crespo, "has flair, affection for his characters and a surprising naturalness in bringing together stories from both sides", even if possibly missing more dialogues concerning a deeper political-social reflection, while considering Uribe's direction to be professional and neat yet lacking any punch or surprise, hence the fresh elements in the film rather come from the combination of some script lines and some of the performances.

Jonathan Holland of Variety underscored the film to be a "well-appointed but unexciting historical thriller", with the film mixing politics, history and passion "into plodding fare", even if there are "a couple of memorable, touching scenes" towards the end of the film.

Fausto Fernández of Fotogramas scored 2 out of 5 stars, writing about the film's "languishing" tone and lack of passion, underpinning "a mechanical illustration", while pointing out that, within its "atonic" formal correctness, there are however sequences where Karra Elejalde shines as a villainous military judge.

Accolades 

|-
| align = "center" rowspan = "2" | 2012 || rowspan = "2" | 15th Málaga Film Festival || Silver Biznaga for Best Direction || Imanol Uribe ||  || rowspan = "2" | 
|-
| Silver Biznaga for Best New Screenwriter || Remedios Crespo || 
|-
|align = "center" | 2015 || 4th Sophia Awards || Best Original Score || Nuno Malo ||  || align = "center" | 
|}

See also 
 List of Spanish films of 2012
 List of Portuguese films of 2014

References

External links 
 Orange Honey at ICAA's Catálogo de Cinespañol

2010s Spanish-language films
Films shot in the province of Cádiz
Films shot in Madrid
Films set in the 1950s
Films set in Andalusia
2012 drama films
Spanish drama films
Portuguese drama films
2010s Spanish films